On February 20, 2021, United Airlines Flight 328 (UA328/UAL328), a scheduled U.S. domestic passenger flight from Denver to Honolulu, suffered a contained engine failure four minutes after takeoff from Denver International Airport (DEN). Falling debris was recorded by eyewitnesses using smartphone cameras and a dash cam. Debris fell through the roof of a private home and significantly damaged a parked vehicle.

The engine failure resulted in an in-flight engine fire, extensive damage to the engine nacelle, and minor damage to the fuselage. Passengers also recorded video of the engine nacelle damage and in-flight fire and posted these to social media. The failed engine was a Pratt & Whitney (P&W) model PW4077 turbofan.

The crew secured the failed engine, and the aircraft returned to Denver using the remaining working engine, landing without further incident 24 minutes after takeoff at 13:28 local time. There were no reported injuries to persons onboard or on the ground. The U.S. National Transportation Safety Board immediately began investigating.

Similar 777-200 series aircraft were quickly grounded by several national aviation authorities, including the U.S. Federal Aviation Administration, which issued an Emergency Airworthiness Directive requiring U.S. operators of airplanes equipped with similar Pratt & Whitney PW4000-112 series engines to inspect these engines' fan blades before further flight. Japan Air Lines, which had a similar incident in December 2020, retired all of its P&W-equipped Boeing 777-200s a year earlier than planned in March 2021. United Airlines, which also had a similar incident in 2018,  grounded their Pratt & Whitney powered 777-200s from early to mid 2021 until July 2022 (with the exception of the accident aircraft.)

Aircraft 

The incident aircraft, N772UA, is a Boeing 777-222, the United Airlines-specific variant of the original 777-200 series. It was built in November 1994 ( 26930/Line no.5) and delivered to United in September 1995. Originally the aircraft was designated as WA005, one of the original Boeing 777-200s that took part in the flight test certification program prior to its entry into commercial service. Boeing stopped building the 777 with P&W PW4000 series engines in 2013, and the engine is no longer in active production. After extensive repair, the grounded aircraft was returned to service on  August 21, 2022.

The Boeing 777 is a long-range, wide-body, twin-engine aircraft. At the time of the incident it had a relatively low accident fatality rate. The only two 777 accidents with total loss of aircraft, passengers and crew are Malaysia Airlines flights MH17 that was shot down over Ukraine in July 2014 and MH370 that disappeared over the Indian Ocean in March 2014. The other fatal accidents, Emirates Flight 521 and Asiana Airlines Flight 214, were both attributed to pilot error. Two other hull losses with passenger injuries occurred: EgyptAir Flight 667 had a cockpit fire while parked at the gate at Cairo Airport, and British Airways Flight 38 crashed on landing at Heathrow Airport. The latter was attributed to a design defect in its Rolls-Royce Trent 895-17 engines, not the P&W engines on this incident aircraft.

Engine 

The original 777-200 was distinctive for its Pratt & Whitney PW4000 engines that are about as wide as a Boeing 737 fuselage. The PW4077 variant used on the United 777-222 nominally produces  of thrust. It is a dual-spool, axial-flow, high bypass turbofan engine, that is a higher bypass version of the PW4000-94 engine originally fitted to the Boeing 747-400. It was redesigned exclusively for the 777 with a larger  diameter fan section using 22 hollow-core fan blades.

The hollow-core fan blade that experienced metal fatigue failure in this incident had only undergone 2,979 cycles since its last trip to the P&W factory for nondestructive testing using thermal acoustic imaging (TAI) to find hidden internal defects. This interval is less than half of the 6,500 cycle test frequency established in 2019 after a similar engine failure on a previous United Airlines 777-222 flight to Honolulu (UA1175) in 2018. The subject blade underwent TAI inspections in 2014 and 2016. The TAI inspection data collected in 2016 was re-examined in 2018 after the UA1175 incident.

Japan's transport ministry ordered increased inspection frequency after the similar JAL 777-200/PW4000 engine failure incident at Naha Airport (OKA) in Japan on December 4, 2020. The US Federal Aviation Administration was also considering increased inspections as a result of that incident, but had not acted prior to this incident in Denver.

Crew 
According to the Air Line Pilots Association (ALPA), the captain had been with United Airlines since 1990 and the first officer had been with United since 1999. Both pilots were based in San Francisco.

Incident 

The aircraft arrived at Denver International Airport (DEN) as flight UA2465 at 10:50 local time. At 13:04 local time it departed normally from Runway 25 en route to Daniel K. Inouye International Airport (HNL) as flight UA328. The flight crew indicated to the NTSB that they advanced power at that time to minimize time in expected turbulence during their climb up to their assigned altitude of flight level 230 (roughly ). Immediately after the throttles were advanced, a loud bang was recorded on the Cockpit Voice Recorder (CVR). FDR data indicated the engine made an uncommanded shutdown and the engine fire warning activated shortly after. A fan blade out failure within the right (#2) engine resulted in parts of the engine cowling disintegrating and falling to the ground in Broomfield, Colorado. No one on the ground or in the aircraft was injured, although flying debris resulted in a hole in the wing to body fairing, a non-critical composite part designed to reduce aerodynamic drag.

The flight crew contacted air traffic control to declare an emergency and request a left turn to return to the airport. The flight crew began to complete checklists, including the engine fire checklist. As part of the checklist, the flight crew discharged both fire extinguisher bottles into the engine, but the engine fire warning did not extinguish until the airplane was on an extended downwind for landing. The flight crew continued to prepare for the emergency landing by completing additional critical checklists and verifying airplane performance for landing. They elected not to dump fuel for safety and time reasons and determined that the excess landing weight was not significant enough to outweigh other considerations.

The captain accomplished a one-engine-inoperative approach and landing to runway 26 without further incident. Airport Rescue and Firefighting (ARFF) met the airplane as soon as it stopped on the runway and applied water and foaming agent to the right engine. The base of the engine experienced a flare up, which was quickly extinguished. Once cleared by ARFF, the airplane was towed off the runway where the passengers disembarked via air stairs and were bussed to the terminal. Passengers were re-booked on flight UA3025 – operated by a different Boeing 777, N773UA, a sister ship to N772UA immediately ahead of it on the production line – that took off hours later.

Similar incidents 

Media analysis of this incident frequently cited three related catastrophic engine failure incidents involving Pratt & Whitney PW4000 series turbofan engines: two previous incidents on the same 777-200 aircraft family with the PW4000-112 series engines with hollow-core fan blades that developed internal cracks, and one contemporaneous incident on an older widebody aircraft design with the original PW4000-94 series engine. At his press briefing two days after the incident, NTSB Chairman Robert Sumwalt said it remained to be seen whether the failure is consistent with a previous incident in February 2018 on United Airlines. "I think what's important is that we really truly understand the facts, circumstances, and conditions around this particular event before we can compare it to any other events," he noted. "But certainly we will want to know if there's a similarity."

United Airlines Flight 1175 

On February 13, 2018, the same replacement aircraft used to accommodate the passengers from this incident, N773UA, originating from San Francisco as United Airlines Flight 1175 (UA1175), had a similar engine failure and loss of the engine cowling. The aircraft was eventually repaired and returned to service.

The separated inlet cowl and fan doors fell in the ocean; unlike the UA328 incident, they were not recovered. The NTSB determined that a fan blade fractured from a pre-existing metal fatigue crack that had been slowly propagating since 2010, leading to the failure. The investigation faulted Pratt & Whitney for not identifying the crack in two previous inspections due to a lack of training in Pratt & Whitney's thermal acoustic image (TAI) inspection process, resulting in "an incorrect evaluation of an indication that resulted in a blade with a crack being returned to service where it eventually fractured." Boeing had been working on a redesign for a replacement fan cowl as a result of that incident, according to documents reviewed by the Wall Street Journal.

Japan Airlines Flight 904 

It returned to OKA and landed safely, but the Japan Transport Safety Board considered it a "serious incident" and launched an investigation. They later confirmed that the engine also had two broken fan blades, one with a metal fatigue fracture, similar to both United incidents.

Longtail Aviation Flight 5504 

Coincidentally, on the same day as the United 328 incident, a Boeing 747-400BCF operating as Longtail Aviation flight LGT-5504, experienced an uncontained engine failure shortly after departing Maastricht Airport in the Netherlands, and two people were injured by debris that also fell in a residential area. That aircraft was powered by four PW4056 engines, a version of the earlier PW4000-94 engine.

Investigation 

The National Transportation Safety Board (NTSB) is investigating the incident. An NTSB structures engineer and two investigators from the NTSB's Denver office collected fallen debris with local law enforcement and safety agencies over several days immediately after the incident. Most of the structure from the inlet cowl and fan cowl doors that separated from the aircraft was recovered and identified. Recovered portions of the inlet cowl, fan cowl door structure, and inlet cowl attach ring were laid out in a hangar (pictured). The inlet cowl, fan cowl doors, and thrust reversers will be examined further by NTSB investigators to map damage and cowl failure patterns after the fan blade failure, and to examine the subsequent progression of fire in the thrust reversers.

The NTSB noted upon initial inspection two fan blades had fractured, one near its root and an adjacent one about mid-span; a portion of one blade was embedded in the containment ring. The remainder of the fan blades exhibited damage to the tips and leading edges. The failed blades were removed and flown by private jet to Pratt & Whitney's laboratory in Hartford, Connecticut for further examination.

On February 22, 2021, National Transportation Safety Board Chairman Robert Sumwalt announced that the damage to the fan blade is consistent with metal fatigue, according to a preliminary assessment. Sumwalt also said that, "by our strictest definition," the NTSB did not consider the incident an uncontained engine failure because, "the containment ring contained the parts as they were flying out." He said the NTSB will look into why the engine cowling separated from the aircraft and why there was a fire, despite indications that the fuel supply to the engine had been turned off.

On March 5, 2021, the NTSB released an update on the incident. They provided more detail on their preliminary examination of the right engine fire damage, saying they found it was primarily contained to the engine's accessory components, thrust reverser skin, and composite honeycomb structure of the inboard and outboard thrust reversers. Both halves of the aft cowl appeared to be intact and undamaged. The spar valve, which stops fuel flow to the engine when the fire switch is pulled in the cockpit, was found closed; there was no evidence of a fuel-fed fire. Examination of the cockpit found that the right engine fire switch had been pulled and turned to the "DISCH 1" position, and both fire bottle discharge lights were illuminated. Examination of the engine accessories showed multiple broken fuel, oil, and hydraulic lines and that the gearbox was fractured.

In addition, the NTSB stated in this update that initial examination of the right engine fan revealed that the spinner and spinner cap were in place and appeared to be undamaged. The fan hub was intact but could not be rotated by hand. All fan blade roots were in place in the fan hub, and two blades were fractured. One fan blade was fractured transversely across the airfoil and the blade's fracture surface was consistent with fatigue. A second fan blade was fractured transversely across the airfoil and the second blade's fracture surfaces had shear lips consistent with an overload failure. The remaining fan blades were full length but all had varying degrees of impact damage to the airfoils.

Reactions 

 
At 13:41, the Broomfield, Colorado Police Department posted on Twitter: "Getting reports that a plane flying over @broomfield had engine trouble and dropped debris in several neighborhoods around 1:08 pm." The department continued to update the thread, confirming that the aircraft landed safely at Denver International Airport and there were no reported injuries. They also posted several photos showing debris that had been reported, asking the public not to touch or move debris, and to report it to their non-emergency number. At an impromptu press conference at Broomfield County Commons Park, where several pieces of debris landed, Public Information Officer Rachel Welte described their response to a flood of calls from the public, adding, "It's actually remarkable, given the amount of people that are at this park this time of day, we are absolutely fortunate that no one was injured."

On February 22, the day after the UA328 incident: 
The Japanese Ministry of Land, Infrastructure, Transport and Tourism ordered the grounding of 32 Boeing 777 aircraft operated by Japan Airlines and All Nippon Airways. 
The U.S. Federal Aviation Administration (FAA) ordered increased inspections of Boeing 777 aircraft with PW4000 engines; 
United Airlines preemptively removed all such airliners (of which it has 28 in storage, and 24 in use) from active service. 
Boeing recommended worldwide grounding of all 128 of its Boeing 777-200 series aircraft equipped with Pratt & Whitney PW4000-112 engines. 
The British Civil Aviation Authority banned PW4000-112-powered Boeing 777s from entering UK airspace, although no British airlines operated that type of aircraft. 
Transport Canada stated that a ban of the type was being considered in Canadian airspace. Although no airlines in Canada had 777's with the PW4000, the Transportation Safety Board of Canada considered precautions.
On February 23, Pratt & Whitney released a statement that the company was cooperating with federal investigators and coordinating with operators and regulators to support a revised inspection interval of the PW4000 engines.
On February 24, the FAA followed its counterparts in the other countries and issued an Emergency Airworthiness Directive (EAD) that required U.S. operators of airplanes equipped with certain Pratt & Whitney PW4000 engines to inspect these engines' fan blades with thermal acoustic imaging before further flight, grounding the US fleet only operated by United. Industry observers noted the FAA issued its EAD unusually quickly, just three days after the incident, and speculated this newfound urgency resulted from the Boeing 737 MAX crisis.
On February 25, an industry source noted the fan blade inspections take approximately 8 hours per blade, and P&W could only process blades at the rate of 10 sets of 22 per engine per month. Consequently, the aircraft affected would only re-enter service very slowly, unless the FAA decides to relax the TAI inspection requirements after evaluating the initial results.
On April 5, Japan Airlines said that it had, "decided to accelerate the retirement of all P&W equipped Boeing 777 by March 2021, which (was) originally planned by March 2022."
On April 21, United Airlines announced that their Boeing 777-200s with PW4000 engines would be returned to service in the near future. A week later, the British Civil Aviation Authority lifted its ban on Boeing 777's with the PW4000 engines, allowing them to enter UK airspace again.
On May 12, at a Federal Aviation Administration Safety Oversight Hearing before the United States House of Representatives transportation sub-committee, FAA Administrator Stephen Dickson said the agency is "requiring the manufacturers to address strengthen(ing) the cowling" on Boeing 777-200 aircraft equipped with Pratt & Whitney engines. Separately, the agency said the timing "will depend on the completion of design and engineering work and will be approved by the FAA." and Boeing said it was continuing to work with the FAA on "potential design improvements" for the inlet and fan cowlings, but added that the, "work is exacting and time consuming."
On June 28, the grounded United Airlines 777-200s still had not returned to service, so United announced a schedule revision to meet high demand for flights to Hawaii, but said they "anticipate the Pratt and Whitney 777s returning soon".
On August 30, The Wall Street Journal reported that United's grounded 777-200s were unlikely to return to service until 2022 due to additional safety measures.
On May 17, 2022, the FAA finally allowed United's 777-200s to resume service.
Jin Air returned its first 777 to service on Jun 12 2022.

Groundings by aircraft operators

See also 

 
 British Airways Flight 2276, in 2015
 Air France Flight 66, in 2017
 Delta Air Lines Flight 30, in 2018
 Qantas Flight 32, in 2010
 Southwest Airlines Flight 1380, in 2018
 Korean Air Flight 2708, in 2016
 Southwest Airlines Flight 3472, in 2016
 Volga-Dnepr Airlines Flight 4066, in 2020
United Airlines Flight 1175, in 2018.

Notes

References 

2021 in Colorado
Accidents and incidents involving the Boeing 777
Airliner accidents and incidents in Colorado
Aviation accidents and incidents in the United States in 2021
Broomfield, Colorado
February 2021 events in the United States
328
Airliner accidents and incidents involving uncontained engine failure
Airliner accidents and incidents caused by engine failure